Marumba maackii, the Manchurian hawkmoth, is a species of moth of the family Sphingidae. It is known from the Russian Far East, north-eastern China, North Korea, South Korea and Hokkaido in northern Japan.

The wingspan is 78–96 mm. It can be distinguished from all other Marumba species by the buff-yellow colour of the costal and distal margins of the hindwing upperside. There are two spots touching and thus forming an eight-shaped marking located on the tornus.

There is one main generation in the Russian Far East with adults on wing from June to late July. However, in warm years there is a partial second generation, with adults in May or June and in August. In Korea, adults have been recorded in July and August.

The larvae feed on Tilia species, including particularly Tilia amurensis, Tilia japonica, Tilia platyphyllos and Tilia tomentosa.

Subspecies
Marumba maackii maackii (Russian Far East, northeastern China, North Korea, South Korea and northern Japan (Hokkaido))
Marumba maackii ochreata Mell, 1935 (Tianmu Mountains of Zhejiang in China)

References

Marumba
Moths described in 1861